Home Islands are a group of islands off the coast of Queensland, Australia. They are one of the northernmost localities in Australia.

References

Islands of Queensland